Scott Michael Nagy (born June 7, 1966) is an American college basketball coach and the current head coach for Wright State Raiders men's basketball.  He had previously served as head coach at South Dakota State for 21 seasons (1995–2016).

Born in Abilene, Texas, Nagy attended St. Matthews grade school in Champaign, Illinois and Champaign Centennial High School, which he graduated from in 1984. His father is Dick Nagy, who was a  University of Illinois assistant basketball coach under Lou Henson.

Nagy played basketball collegiately at Delta State University, where he currently holds school records for most career games played and most assists in a career (549), season (234) and game (15).

After graduation, Nagy became a graduate assistant at the University of Illinois for two seasons before taking a full-time assistant's job at South Dakota State, which he held for three years. After two seasons as an assistant at SIU Edwardsville, Nagy returned to South Dakota State to take over as head coach in May 1995.

Nagy led the Jackrabbits to 20-win seasons during eight of his first nine years at the helm of the program at the Division II level. After the 2004 season, South Dakota State began the transition to Division I.

The 2007–08 season was Nagy's first as a head coach in a Division I conference, as the Jackrabbits joined The Summit League on June 1, 2007. The Jackrabbits struggled early in The Summit League, finishing in 10th place their first year. However, under Nagy, SDSU steadily improved.

In 2011–12, South Dakota State won the Summit League tournament championship, qualifying them for their first ever berth in the NCAA tournament. The Jackrabbits also won the conference tournament in 2013 earning back-to-back trips to the NCAA tournament. In 2014, the Jackrabbits received an invitation to the College Basketball Invitational tournament. In 2015, Nagy led the Jackrabbits to a regular season championship and an NIT berth after failing to win the conference tournament. SDSU won their first postseason game in the NIT, defeating No. 1 seed Colorado State before falling to Vanderbilt. In 2016, the Jackrabbits returned to the NCAA tournament by winning the regular season and conference tournament.

Following his success at South Dakota State, he was hired as head coach by Wright State on April 3, 2016. He finished his 21-year career at South Dakota State with a 410–240 record.

Nagy coaches at least one game every season shoeless to support the charity Samaritan's Feet, which distributes shoes to those without worldwide. He has done so every year since the 2007–08 season. He was named the 2012 Barefoot Coach of the Year, an award given to coaches who support the Samaritan's Feet organization and help raise awareness about its cause.

Head coaching record

References

External links
 Wright State profile

1966 births
Living people
American men's basketball coaches
American men's basketball players
Basketball coaches from Texas
Basketball players from Texas
College men's basketball head coaches in the United States
Delta State Statesmen basketball players
Illinois Fighting Illini men's basketball coaches
SIU Edwardsville Cougars men's basketball coaches
South Dakota State Jackrabbits men's basketball coaches
Sportspeople from Abilene, Texas
Wright State Raiders men's basketball coaches